Gas Gas is a Spanish motorcycle manufacturer established in 1985 by Narcìs Casas and Josep Pibernat in Salt, Girona. The company specializes in off-road motorcycles for trials and enduro competitions. Gas Gas was purchased by KTM motorcycles in 2019.  After the sale to KTM, Spanish motorcycle manufacturer Rieju bought the right to produce old Gas Gas off-road models.

Company history
In 1973, Narcìs Casas and Josep Pibernat began operating a Bultaco motorcycle franchise in Salt. With the financial demise of the Bultaco factory in 1979, Casas and Pibernat began importing Italian SWM motorcycles until 1984 when, the manufacturer ceased operations.

Casas and Pibernat then embarked on a programme to manufacture trial motorbikes for sale in their shop. Gas Gas began manufacturing trial motorcycles in 1985, enduro and motocross motorcycles in 1989, and quads in 2002. The name Gas Gas literally means "to gas it" (to accelerate, give it the gas, turn the throttle - to go faster.) The Gas Gas founders have, at times, expressed misgivings about the chosen name as it causes confusion outside Spain. Others have joked that Gas Gas are so good that they had to name them twice. The slogan "Gas Gas = Fast Fast" was used by the US importer, GasGas North America, from 1999–2002 to try to help people understand the unique name.

In 2014, Gas Gas merged with Spanish motorcycle manufacturer Ossa and was ultimately acquired by the Torrot Group in 2015. In 2019, Gas Gas was purchased by Pierer Mobility AG with links to KTM motorcycles.

Championships and riders

In 1993, Gas Gas succeeded in luring the multiple world trials champion Jordi Tarrés away from Beta and he promptly won three successive world trials championships (1993, 1994 and 1995) for Gas Gas.

More recently, Gas Gas won the Trial Outdoor World Championship twice (2005 and 2006) with Adam Raga. It has also won the Trial Indoor World Championship in 2003, 2004, 2005 and 2006 also with Raga riding.

Gas Gas has also been successful in the World Enduro Championship. Paul Edmondson won the 125cc world championship in 1994 and the 250cc class in 1996, Petteri Silván the 250cc and the overall championship in 1999, and Petri Pohjamo the 125cc class in 2003.

In 2006, British Enduro Champion Wayne Braybrook, riding a Gas Gas, was one of only two riders to finish all 80 miles of the Red Bull Last Man Standing event. 126 other riders did not finish the race.

It was announced that Gas Gas would field a one rider team for the 2021 Monster Energy Supercross season. Justin Barcia rode the #51 Troy Lee Designs/Red Bull/Gas Gas Factory Racing team bike to a win in the season opener at Houston.

The brand has competed in the Dakar Rally with Laia Sanz (2012 and 2021), Daniel Sanders (since 2022) and Sam Sunderland (since 2022). Sunderland won the 2022 edition.

Importing
Gas Gas bikes are currently imported into many countries in Europe and around the world, including Australia, New Zealand, Canada, South America, South Africa and the United States.

Models

Enduro/off-road

While the EC ("Enducross") and MC (motocross) models are shipped worldwide, Gas Gas has manufactured specialized models for the United States off-road market. The XC ("Cross Country" produced from 1999–2002) and the DE ("Dealer Edition" produced from 2002–2006) models were successful attempts to customize the product to the US market.

The FSE and FSR are the fuel injected, four-stroke enduro bikes similar in appearance to the EC models.

Prior to 2007, each color on the EC model line represented the engine displacement range of the motor.
 Yellow – 125 cc and 200 cc.
 Red – 50 cc, 250 cc, 400 cc and 450 cc.
 Blue – 300 cc, 450 cc.

In 2007–2009, the company standardised to the colour red for all displacements and models. As of the 2010 model year, all standard EC models are black with red and white accents. The "Six Days" edition uses white plastics with red, yellow, and black accents. The "Racing" models are white with black and yellow accents.

Trials
The TXT models are specifically designed for trials riding. The TXT trials model line also used a similar color code to the EC line.

Quads

The Gas Gas sport quads are sold under the Wild HP brand and come in two-stroke and fuel-injected four-stroke models.

Prior to 2007, the Wild HP line of quads were available in a choice of blue or red regardless of displacement. Beginning in 2007 the Wild HP line standardized to black.

Racing

Grand Prix

Moto2
Starting from the 2022 season, Gas Gas is the sponsor working with the Aspar Team in the Moto2 world championship and uses the name GasGas Aspar Team.

Moto3
After being acquired by KTM, Gas Gas entered the Moto3 World Championship as a unique constructor using their KTM-based RC250GP.

References

External links

Motorcycle manufacturers of Spain
Vehicle manufacturing companies established in 1985
Motorcycle trials
Spanish brands
Spanish companies established in 1985
Motorcycles by brand